The Whidbey Island-class dock landing ship is a dock landing ship of the United States Navy. Introduced to fleet service in 1985, this class of ship features a large well deck for transporting United States Marine Corps (USMC) vehicles and a large flight deck for landing helicopters or V-22 Ospreys. The well deck was designed to hold four LCAC hovercraft, five if the vehicle ramp is raised, for landing Marines. Recent deployments have used a combination of LCU(s), AAVs, tanks, LARCs and other USMC vehicles. The Whidbey Island class of ship also uniquely benefits from multiple cranes and a shallow draft that further make it ideal for participating in amphibious operations.

As of 2009, all ships of the class are scheduled to undergo a midlife upgrade over the next five years to ensure that they remain in service through 2038. The ships will be upgraded annually through 2013, and the last ship will be modernized in 2014. Ships homeported on the East Coast will undergo upgrades at Metro Machine Corp., while those on the West Coast will receive upgrades at General Dynamics National Steel and Shipbuilding Company in San Diego.

Major elements of the upgrade package include diesel engine improvements, fuel and maintenance savings systems, engineering control systems, increased air conditioning and chill water capacity, and replacement of air compressors. The ships also replaced steam systems with all-electric functionality that will decrease maintenance effort and expense.

Ships

Whidbey Island and Tortuga were scheduled to be decommissioned during the FYDP 2013-2018, and the remaining ships of the class were scheduled to be retired before the end of their service lives. However, the Navy reversed its plan to decommission Whidbey Island, and in 2015 Assistant Secretary of the Navy Sean Stackley informed Congress of the Navy's plans to modernize Whidbey Island, Tortuga, and Germantown to extend them each to a 44-year total service life. As of March 2015, the first Whidbey Island-class LSD to be retired will be Fort McHenry in FY 2027.

Sources

US Navy Type Information
Hutchinson, R. (ed.) (2002) Jane's Warship Recognition Guide, London : HarperCollins,

External links

Federation of American Scientists (FAS): LSD-41 Whidbey Island class
GlobalSecurity.org: LSD-41 Whidbey Island class

Amphibious warfare vessel classes
Naval ships of the United States
 
Cold War amphibious warfare vessels of the United States
Amphibious warfare vessels of the United States
Ships built by Lockheed Shipbuilding and Construction Company